Iryna Leshchanka (née Kryuko, born 30 July 1991) is a Belarusian biathlete. She won a gold medal in the 4×6 km relay at the 2018 Olympics. She also competed in the 2014/15 world cup season and represented Belarus at the Biathlon World Championships 2015 in Kontiolahti.

Leshchanka's parents divorced soon after her birth; hence she and her younger brother Victor were raised by their mother. Iryna took up biathlon at age 11, by chance – after their house burned down in a fire, the family moved to a dormitory next to a biathlon training base. Her brother followed her and also became an international biathlon competitor. Iryna debuted internationally at the 2009 World Junior Championships, placing fourth individually. In 2011 she was included in the senior national team.

Olympic Games 
1 medal (1 gold)

World Championships 
0 medals

*During Olympic seasons competitions are only held for those events not included in the Olympic program.
**The single mixed relay was added as an event in 2019.

World Cup

Individual podiums

Relay podiums

References

External links

1991 births
Living people
Belarusian female biathletes
Olympic biathletes of Belarus
Biathletes at the 2018 Winter Olympics
Biathletes at the 2022 Winter Olympics
Olympic gold medalists for Belarus
Olympic medalists in biathlon
Medalists at the 2018 Winter Olympics
Sportspeople from Vitebsk Region